Alan Martin may refer to:

Alan Martin (Australian rules footballer) (1928–2004), Australian rules footballer
Alan Martin (footballer, born 1923) (1923–2004), English football player
Alan Martin (footballer, born 1989), Scottish football goalkeeper for Queen of the South 
Alan Martin (writer), co-creator of Tank Girl
Alan Martin (physicist) (born 1937), British physicist
Alan Gray Martin (born 1930), Canadian parliamentarian

See also
Allan Martin (disambiguation)
Al Martin (disambiguation)